TNT KIDS TV is a specialized children's TV channel in Bosnia and Herzegovina based in the city of Travnik. It was established in 2016 by the TNT Group. The program is produced in Bosnian.

The channel's programming is targeted to children aged 6 to 12 years, and it usually consists of non-violent cartoons and educational programs.

TNT Kids TV is available via cable systems throughout the Bosnia and Herzegovina and former Yugoslavia (with sister channels from TNT Group: Kanal 6 HD, Sevdah TV, DP HD; Radio: TNT Radio Travnik, TNT Radio Tuzla and Narodni Radio Zenica).

References

External links 
 www.tntkids.tv
 www.tntgroup.ba 
 Communications Regulatory Agency of Bosnia and Herzegovina

Television channels and stations established in 2016
Television in Bosnia and Herzegovina
Children's television networks
2016 establishments in Bosnia and Herzegovina